Mehdi Boudjemaa (born 7 April 1998) is a French professional footballer who plays as midfielder for Hungarian club Ferencváros, on loan from Turkish club Hatayspor.

Career

Guingamp
Born in Cergy in the Val-d'Oise department of Île-de-France, Boudjemaa was raised in Beauvais, Oise. He began playing for AS Beauvais Oise, and had a year at RC Strasbourg Alsace when he was 15, before returning to Beauvais to play in the national under-17 division. After their relegation, he had one season at Olympique Saint-Quentin where he attracted the attention of EA Guingamp.

Boudjemaa began playing for Guingamp's reserve team in the fifth-tier Championnat National 3. After turning down an approach from Stade Brestois 29, he was first called up by the first team for their Ligue 1 game at Stade Malherbe Caen on 20 October 2018, remaining unused in a goalless draw. The following 19 February, he signed his first professional contract, for two-and-a-half years. He made his professional debut with the club in a 1–0 Ligue 2 win over Orléans on 9 August 2019, as a 63rd-minute substitute for Bryan Pelé.

On 9 January 2020, Boudjemaa was loaned to third-tier Championnat National team US Quevilly-Rouen Métropole, where he made five appearances before the season was curtailed by the COVID-19 pandemic. He joined Stade Lavallois of the same league on the same basis on 5 June.

Hatayspor
Boudjemaa moved abroad for the first time on 8 July 2021, joining Hatayspor of the Turkish Süper Lig. The following 4 April, he was sent off for two late yellow cards in a goalless draw at home to local rivals Adana Demirspor.

On 6 January 2023, Boudjemaa survived the earthquake that killed Hatayspor player Christian Atsu and sporting director Taner Savut among tens of thousands of others. The club withdrew from the season and ten days later, he joined Hungarian Nemzeti Bajnokság I leaders Ferencvárosi TC on loan with the option to buy.

Personal life
Born in France, Boudjemaa is of Algerian descent. In 2017, he expressed interest in representing the Algeria national football team.

References

External links
 
 

1998 births
Living people
Footballers from Val-d'Oise
Sportspeople from Beauvais
French footballers
French sportspeople of Algerian descent
Association football midfielders
AS Beauvais Oise players
RC Strasbourg Alsace players
Olympique Saint-Quentin players
En Avant Guingamp players
US Quevilly-Rouen Métropole players
Stade Lavallois players
Hatayspor footballers
Ferencvárosi TC footballers
Ligue 2 players
Championnat National players
Championnat National 2 players
Championnat National 3 players
Süper Lig players
Nemzeti Bajnokság I players
French expatriate footballers
Expatriate footballers in Turkey
Expatriate footballers in Hungary
French expatriate sportspeople in Turkey
French expatriate sportspeople in Hungary